Reno is an unincorporated community in Clay Township, Hendricks County, Indiana.

History
Reno was platted in 1870 when the railroad was extended to that point. It was likely named for Jesse L. Reno, an officer who served in the Mexican–American War. A post office was established at Reno in 1870, and remained in operation until it was discontinued in 1912.

Geography

References

Unincorporated communities in Hendricks County, Indiana
Unincorporated communities in Indiana
Indianapolis metropolitan area